Post-stroke depression (PSD) is considered the most frequent and important neuropsychiatric consequence of stroke. Approximately one-third of stroke survivors experience major depression. Moreover, this condition can have an adverse effect on cognitive function, functional recovery and survival.


Mechanism
The scientific community is divided into two “camps” supporting opposing views: some propose a primary biological mechanism with stroke affecting neural circuits involved in mood regulation which in turn causes post-stroke depression, while other researchers claim that post stroke depression is caused by social and psychological stressors that emerge as a result of stroke.

While an integrated bio-psycho-social model including both biological and psychosocial aspects of post stroke depression seems warranted, a number of studies clearly suggest that biological mechanisms play a major role in the development of post stroke depression.

stroke patients show a higher rate of depression compared to orthopedic patients with disabilities of comparable severity.
Several studies proposed an association with specific lesions (left anterior and basal ganglia lesions and lesions close to frontal pole) and occurrence of post stroke depression.
Some studies reported an association between post-stroke mania and right orbital frontal, basotemporal, basal ganglia lesions.
It has been shown that patients with anosognosia who are unaware of their disability still develop post stroke depression.

Despite this evidence, the association of post-stroke depression to specific brain lesions is still vague and needs replication from various independent groups. Furthermore, the cause of post stroke depression at a functional level is not clear.

The only biological model was proposed by Robinson and co-workers: They hypothesized that the depletion of monoaminergic amines occurring after stroke play a role in post stroke-depression. They point out that norepinephrinergic and serotonergic nuclei send projections to the frontal cortex and arc posteriorly, running through the deep layers of the cortex, where they arborize and send terminal projections into the superficial cortical layers. These norepinephrinergic and serotoninergic pathways are disrupted in basal ganglia and frontal lobe lesions – sites that are shown to be associated with post stroke depression. Additionally, depletion in dopamine (due to pallidal lesions) can trigger anhedonia and avolition.

However, this model is far from being universally accepted and there are serious objections both to their model and findings showing the association between post-stroke depression and lesion sites. Depression-like behaviors are demonstrated in a mouse model of cortical intracerebral hemorrhage.

Diagnosis

Definition
The Diagnostic and Statistical Manual (DSM) IV categorizes post-stroke depression as “mood disorder due to a general medical condition” (i.e. stroke) with the specifiers of depressive features, major depressive-like episodes, manic features, or mixed features. Utilizing patient data from acute hospital admission, community surveys, or out patient clinics previous studies have identified two types of depressive disorders associated with cerebral ischemia: major depression, which occurs in up to 25% of patients; and minor depression, which has been defined for research purposes by DSM-IV criteria as a depressed mood or loss of interest and at least two but fewer than four symptoms of major depression. Minor depression occurs in up to 30% of patients following stroke.

Prevalence
Prevalence clearly varies over time with an apparent peak 3–6 months after stroke and subsequent decline in prevalence at one-year reaches about to 50% of initial rates. Robinson and colleagues characterized the natural course of major depression after stroke with spontaneous remission typically 1 to 2 years after stroke. However, it was also noted that in few cases depression becomes chronic and may persist more than 3 years following stroke. On the other hand, minor depression appeared to be more variable, with both short term and long term depression occurring in these patients.

Post-stroke depression is highly prevalent among both men and women. However, it appears that post-stroke depression is more common in women when prevalence is compared between the sexes.

Women were twice as likely to experience post-stroke depression than men. It is hypothesized, based on CT scanning, that of the two sexes experiencing post-stroke depression, women who had post-stroke depression had a higher rate of left hemisphere lesions than men. However, risk of post-stroke depression can not be determined effectively based on the location of the lesion in the brain and more research in this area is needed.

It has also been postulated that the risk of developing post-stroke depression in male patients is partly linked to having a high level of limitations and disability in functioning, especially in performing activities of daily living (ADL's), as a result of their stroke; the greater the limitation, the greater the severity. Risk of developing depression post-stroke in women is partly linked to a history of psychological disorders as well as limitations involving cognition as a result of their stroke.

References

Sources

 
 
 
 

Major depressive disorder
Mood disorders
Stroke